The Boise Fire Department is the agency that provides fire suppression services within the city of Boise, Idaho and contract services to two suburban fire districts including the city of Garden City and village of Hidden Springs. It is the largest fire department in Idaho. Emergency Medical Services (EMS) are provided by the separate county agency, Ada County Paramedics. Currently, Boise Fire Department has 300+ full time employees, 17 Fire Stations, a Hazardous Materials Team, ARFF team, Dive Team and a Technical Rescue Team. The Department serves a population of 236,000 residents in 130+ square miles.

History 
Boise's first fire department was created on January 24, 1876; consisting of 28 volunteers. Engine Company #1 and Hook and Ladder Company #1 were housed in a converted blacksmith shop at 619 Main St., a one-story wood building which, ironically, burned down on Sept. 23, 1883. In 1902, the city created a paid, professional fire department with a part-time chief, three drivers and "pay-per-call" stokers and firefighters. The 1940's population growth led to a large expansion. The 1950's saw the introduction of radios and the dispatch office, but also saw a number of major downtown structure fires. The 1960's saw a staff of 107 firefighters with a call volume exceeding 1,000 alarms for the first time. The airport also needed specific Aircraft Rescue and Fire Fighting (ARFF) equipment, and another station was built on-site in 1965. The 1970's saw 14 new pieces of equipment and vehicles purchased. With Boise's population reaching 102,000 in 1980, the department could not keep up. In 1982, over $2.46 million was lost due to an arson spree. And by 1989, the call volume was exceeding 7,000 call annually. The 1990's saw new construction, and upgraded training facility and grew to 15 stations by 1998.

Their first female captain was promoted in 2019.

Organization 
The department has four (4) divisions as well as a Pipe and Drum corp and an Honor Guard.

Bureaus 
 Emergency Services
 Support Services
 Planning and Administration
 Bureau of Fire Prevention

Operations

Fire Station Locations and Apparatus (2021) 

The BFD firefighting operations are based out of the city's 17 local fire stations.

* EMS Services supplied by  Ada County Paramedics

See also

 Idaho Fallen Firefighters Memorial Park
 Boise, Idaho
 Ada County, Idaho

References

External Links
 
 Idaho Fallen Firefighters Foundation

Boise, Idaho
Firefighting in Idaho